The 2014 Ykkönen began on 27 April 2014 and ended on 4 October 2014. The winning team was directly promoted to the 2015 Veikkausliiga. The bottom two teams were relegated to Kakkonen.

Overview

A total of ten teams will contest in the league, including seven sides from the 2013 season, JJK who was relegated from Veikkausliiga and FC Jazz and HIFK who promoted from Kakkonen after winning the promotion play-offs.

AC Kajaani and OPS were relegated from 2013 Ykkönen. SJK was promoted to the 2014 Veikkausliiga.

Managerial changes

League table

Results

Matches 1–18

Matches 19–27

Statistics

Top scorers
Source: palloverkko.palloliitto.fi

Monthly awards

See also
 2014 Veikkausliiga
 2014 Kakkonen

References

External links
 Official site 

Ykkönen seasons
2014 in Finnish football leagues
Fin
Fin